Actias artemis is a moth native to Japan, Korea, China, India and Malaysia. The species was first described by Otto Vasilievich Bremer and William Grey in 1853. Actias artemis is a close relative and look-alike of Actias luna, the American Luna moth.

Images of life cycle

Host plants
Larvae can be fed on willow (Salix), alder (Alnus), hickory (Carya), oak, plum, walnut and maple.

References

Artemis
Moths of Asia
Moths described in 1853